RJMetrics is an American software company headquartered in Philadelphia, Pennsylvania. The company offers big data analytics to small and midsize businesses.

History
RJMetrics was founded in 2008 by Jake Stein and Robert J. Moore. The company had over 300 customers as of September 2014.

Funding
RJMetrics was a bootstrapped company until it received its first round of funding in 2012. The seed round was $1.2 million and came from Red Swan Ventures, Vision Ventures, SoftTech VC, Zelkova Ventures, Lerer Ventures, and SV Angel. In May 2013, RJMetrics received its Series A funding of $6.25 million from Trinity Ventures and SoftTech VC.

In September 2014, RJMetrics received its Series B funding of $16.5 million from SoftTech VC, Trinity Ventures, and August Capital. To-date, the Series B funding is one of the biggest rounds of funding received by a Philadelphia-based IT startup.

Acquisition
In August 2016, Magento acquired RJMetrics, and Stitch, Inc. was spun out as an independent company, with the same investors as RJMetrics.

Platform
RJMetrics is a software as a service business intelligence platform. In July 2014 RJMetrics announced the v2 release of its product and rebranded as an analytics platform. The release included improvements to every major part of the software.
 Analytic Warehouse: Built on Amazon Redshift
 Transformation Cluster: Built on top of Hadoop
 Visualization Interface: Allows users to perform cohort analysis, calculate repeat event probability, and combine data from multiple sources

Data journalism
RJMetrics has received a significant amount of press for their data journalism. Notable coverage includes: 
 The Wall Street Journal covering RJMetrics’ analysis of Crunchbase
 Fast Company covering RJMetrics’ analysis of Airbnb
 Forbes covering RJMetrics’ analysis of the ALS ice bucket challenge
 TechCrunch covering RJMetrics’ analysis of the Biz Stone's Jelly App

In 2012, comedian Daniel Tosh covered RJMetrics' analysis of Chatroulette

References

External links
 Official Website

Data visualization software
Marketing analytics
Companies based in Philadelphia